The Second Lady is a political thriller by Irving Wallace.

Commercial Reception
The Second Lady was a New York Times bestseller; it was on the list for nine weeks, peaking at #8.

Film Adaptation
The novel was adapted into a Hindi feature film, Sharara (1984), starring Hema Malini.

References

External links
 ISBNDB Link

1980 American novels
American novels adapted into films
American thriller novels
Novels by Irving Wallace
Political thrillers
New American Library books